Twentynine Palms Airport  is a public use airport located six nautical miles (11 km) east of the central business district of Twentynine Palms, a city in San Bernardino County, California, United States. It is owned by the County of San Bernardino.

History

It was activated on 1 January 1942 by the United States Army Air Forces. It started as USAAF contract glider training, and was called Twenty-Nine Palms Air Academy until 16 February 1943. It had four axillary airfields in local area, including Condor Field. Flying training was performed with Fairchild PT-19s as the primary trainer. It also had several PT-17 Stearmans and a few P-40 Warhawks assigned.  It conducted basic flying training from March 1943 until being transferred to United States Navy April 1944. General Henry H. Arnold, Chief of the Army Air Forces, ordered the training for 150 glider pilots for World War II. By the end of WW2 over 6,000 glider pilots had been trained. In all 1,654 of the glider pilots were trained at the Twentynine Palms Air Academy. It was under USN control and became an auxiliary airfield to NAS San Diego.

Facilities and aircraft
It has two asphalt paved runways: 8/26 is 5,531 by 75 feet (1,686 x 23 m) and 17/35 is 3,797 by 50 feet (1,157 x 15 m).

For the 12-month period ending February 16, 2006, the airport had 18,000 aircraft operations, an average of 49 per day: 97% general aviation and 3% military. At that time there were 16 aircraft based at this airport: 68% single-engine, 6% multi-engine and 25% glider.

See also
 California World War II Army Airfields
 36th Flying Training Wing (World War II)
United States Army Air Forces Contract Flying School Airfields
IX Troop Carrier Command

References

Other sources

 
 Manning, Thomas A. (2005), History of Air Education and Training Command, 1942–2002.  Office of History and Research, Headquarters, AETC, Randolph AFB, Texas  
 Shaw, Frederick J. (2004), Locating Air Force Base Sites, History’s Legacy, Air Force History and Museums Program, United States Air Force, Washington DC.

External links
 Twentynine Palms Airport at County of San Bernardino website
 openNav: TNP / KTNP charts
 

Airfields of the United States Army Air Forces in California
Airports in San Bernardino County, California
Twentynine Palms, California
USAAF Contract Flying School Airfields
1942 establishments in California
Airports established in 1942
California in World War II